The Swedish Veterinary Disciplinary Board was a Swedish government agency that answered to the Ministry of Agriculture, Food and Consumer Affairs. The agency tried cases of professional misconduct among veterinarians. It was located in Jönköping.

See also
Government agencies in Sweden.

External links
Swedish Veterinary Disciplinary Board - Official site

Veterinary Disciplinary Board
Veterinary organizations
Veterinary medicine in Sweden
Government agencies established in 1947
Government agencies disestablished in 2009